Mount Nero is a mountain (2,520 m) surmounting the west wall of Daniels Range 3 nautical miles (6 km) north of Forsythe Bluff, in the Usarp Mountains. Mapped by United States Geological Survey (USGS) from surveys and U.S. Navy air photos, 1960–63. Named by Advisory Committee on Antarctic Names (US-ACAN) for Leonard L. Nero, United States Antarctic Research Program (USARP) research assistant to Dr. J. S. Zaneveld and lead diver for the first planned winter diving expedition (WINFLY I)in 1967 and latter biologist and assistant manager of laboratories at McMurdo Station, 1968–69.

See also
Fisher Spur

References

Mountains of Oates Land